Chiu Meng-jen (born 26 July 1978) is a Taiwanese taekwondo practitioner. She won a bronze medal in heavyweight at the 1997 World Taekwondo Championships in Hong Kong, after being defeated by Natalia Ivanova in the semifinal.

References

External links

1978 births 
Living people
Taiwanese female taekwondo practitioners
World Taekwondo Championships medalists
20th-century Taiwanese women